Max Swarner is a professional singer and actor from Dallas, TX.

Select Theatre Credits 
"Luke/Abe" (swing) in Altar Boyz, Uptown Players 

"Che" in Evita, Repertory Company Theatre 

Chorus in Casper: The Musical starring Chita Rivera, Dallas Summer Musicals

Awards 
WINNER - Best Featured Actor in a Musical - 1776 - 2013 Column Awards 
WINNER - Best Actor in a Musical - How to Succeed in Business Without Really Trying - 2012 Column Awards 
WINNER - Best Actor in a Musical - How to Succeed in Business Without Really Trying - 2011 DFW Critics Forum Awards 
WINNER - Ben Brettell Award, 2007 Column Awards 
Nominee - Best Supporting Actor in a Musical - The Secret Garden - 2007 Column Awards
Nominee - Best Supporting Actor in a Musical - The Secret Garden - 2007 Leon Rabin Awards
Nominee - Best Supporting Actor in a Musical - Into the Woods - 2005 Column Awards

References 

American male singers
American male musical theatre actors
People from Dallas
Living people
Year of birth missing (living people)